St Edmund's School, Ipswich may refer to:

 St Edmunds College, Ipswich, a Catholic secondary day school for boys in Ipswich, Queensland, Australia
 St Edmund's School, a former preparatory school in Ipswich, Suffolk and then at Kesgrave Hall

See also
 St. Edmund's College (disambiguation)
 St Edmund's School (disambiguation)